This is part of the list of Australian diarists of World War I, covering diarists with family names beginning with "H" through to "N". List of A-G, O-Z.

References

 
Australian military personnel of World War I
Diarists of World War I